Sir John Edge (28 July 1841 – 30 July 1926) was Chief Justice in the Allahabad High Court, India, during the British Raj era. A member of the Middle Temple, of which he acted for some time as treasurer, he was also appointed a judicial member of the Council of India and a member of the Privy Council.

Early life 
John Edge was the only child of Benjamin Booker Edge and his wife, Esther Anne. He was born on 28 July 1841 in Queen's County, Ireland (now County Laois). His family claimed a Saxon origin and had been in Ireland since the Stuart period.

Edge was privately educated prior to attending Trinity College Dublin between 1858 and 1861. He was awarded both B.A. and LL.B. degrees from that institution and was called to the Irish bar in 1864 as a member of the King's Inns in Dublin. Two years later, he was admitted to the English bar by the Middle Temple and proceeded to practise in the north of that country.

Career 
In 1886, Edge became a Queen's Counsel, was made a Knight Bachelor and appointed Chief Justice of the high court of the North-Western Provinces, British India. He replaced William Comer Petheram in that role and was based in Allahabad.

Holding office until 1898, Edge proved to be a capable leader of a court that included several other very talented judges. He also demonstrated considerable administrative skills, such as arranging for the codification of the court's rules and, between 1887 and 1893, serving as the first vice-chancellor of the University of Allahabad. He also headed the famine relief committee set up in response to the 1896 famine in India.

In January 1899, after his recent retirement from the Chief Justice role, Edge became a judicial member of the Council of India and retained that role until 1908. It was at this time that he was also elected to the bench of the Middle Temple, of which he served as treasurer in 1919. In 1902, he also served on a Royal Commission that investigated the Boer War and in 1905 was involved in an inquiry that ultimately had a part in the creation of the Court of Criminal Appeal.

Edge became a privy counsellor in January 1909 and in that role he heard many legal appeals from India between 1916 and May 1926, when he retired completely, just short of his 85th birthday.

Family 
Edge married Laura Loughborough, the daughter of a solicitor from Surrey in England, in September 1867. The couple had one son and four daughters.

Death 
John Edge died suddenly on 30 July 1926 at his house, 123 Oakwood Court in Kensington, London.

Arms

References 
Citations

Bibliography

 

1841 births
1926 deaths
Members of the Council of India
Knights Bachelor
Chief justices
Members of the Privy Council of the United Kingdom
Members of the Middle Temple
Alumni of Trinity College Dublin
People from County Laois
Members of the King's Inns
19th-century King's Counsel
20th-century King's Counsel
Academic staff of the University of Allahabad
Allahabad High Court
Indian academic administrators
Chief Justices of the Allahabad High Court
19th-century Indian judges
20th-century Indian judges
Members of the Judicial Committee of the Privy Council